Joseph F. Stabell was a Major League Baseball player.

Sources

Major League Baseball outfielders
Buffalo Bisons (NL) players
Baseball players from New York (state)
1923 deaths
Jersey City Skeeters players
Rochester Flour Cities players
19th-century baseball players
Year of birth missing